Dhaleshwar is a locality in Agartala, Tripura close to Banamalipur, Indra Nagar, Kalyani and Math Chowhamani. It comes under East Police Station and Dhaleswar Post Office. Dhaleswar's pin code is 799007.

Educational institutes

There are many educational institutions in Dhalehwar. Such as:
 Ramkrishna Vivekananda Vidya Mandir
 Ramkrishna Shishu Tirtha (Madhab Babu-r School)
 Swami Dayalananda Higher Secondary School
 Dhaleswar Higher Secondary School (renamed Kamini Kumar Singha Memorial Higher Secondary School 2 July 2009)
 Prachya Bharati School
 Anka Sekha Child Art Teaching Center
 Ramkrishna Mission

Hospitals and health center 

Dhaleswar Satellite Dispensary is operated by Agartala Municipal Corporation. It is a primary health center. Other private health centers, nursing homes, diagnostics center laboratories are there such as Hepatitis B Cure center, Tropical Nursing Home, Bhowmik Polyclinic, and Agartala Medical Centre, Ortho care & Related Centre, and Ramkrishna Mission.

Bank and ATM

Banks include 
 SBI (bank and ATM)3 branches of SBI (one at Math Chowmuhani, one at Jail Ashram Road & one at Kamarpukur (shifted branch of Chandrapur)
 Bank of Baroda (bank and ATM)
 United Bank of India (bank and ATM)
 UCO Bank (bank only)
 Axis Bank (bank & ATM)
 Bharatiya Mahila Bank (Bank and ATM)

Clubs and social organizations
 Purbag club
 Prantik Club
 Jagriti Club
 Bharat Tirtha Club
 Satadal Sangha
 Tarun Sangha
 Blue Lotus Club
 Ajad Hind Club
 Shanti Niketan Club
 Dateline Agartala Foundation
 Tripura Health & Education Society
 Hepatitis Foundation Of Tripura
 Kalayani club
 Sabyasachi club
 Anik club
 Udichi club
 Anga Sanchalani club

Notable residents 

 Mantu Debnath - Arjuna awardee, professional gymnast.

External links
 Map of Dhaleswar
Tripura Portal
Agartala Municipality

Agartala